Edwin Charles Harrison (born November 18, 1984) is the running backs and quality control coach for the Toronto Argonauts of the Canadian Football League (CFL). He is a former professional gridiron football guard who was a member of the Calgary Stampeders and the Kansas City Chiefs. He won a Grey Cup championship with the Stampeders in 2014. He played college football at Colorado.

Coaching career
On January 19, 2022, it was announced that Harrison had joined the Toronto Argonauts as the team's running backs and quality control coach.

Personal life
Harrison is the grandson of former Outland Trophy winner and CFL offensive lineman Cal Jones, who was one of five players from the 1956 East-West All-Star Game killed when their Vancouver to Calgary plane, Trans-Canada Air Lines Flight 810, crashed into Slesse Mountain, killing all 62 people aboard. Harrison's search to learn more about the life and death of his grandfather and his family history is at the centre of the 2012 documentary The Crash of Flight 810, part of TSN's Engraved on a Nation series of eight documentaries celebrating the 100th Grey Cup.

References

External links
Colorado Buffaloes bio
Kansas City Chiefs bio
Calgary Stampeders bio 

1984 births
Living people
Players of American football from Houston
Players of Canadian football from Houston
American football offensive guards
Canadian football offensive linemen
Colorado Buffaloes football players
Kansas City Chiefs players
Calgary Stampeders players